Jean-Paul Fournier (born 16 October 1945 in Génolhac) is a French politician and a member of the Senate of France and mayor of Nîmes. He represents the Gard department and is a member of The Republicans Party.

Ahead of the 2022 presidential elections, Fournier publicly declared his support for Michel Barnier as the Republicans’ candidate.

References

Page on the Senate website

1945 births
Living people
French Protestants
Rally for the Republic politicians
The Republicans (France) politicians
The Strong Right
French Senators of the Fifth Republic
Mayors of places in Occitania (administrative region)
Senators of Gard